Marcin Michał Ociepa (born 21 October 1984 in Opole) is a Polish politician. He has been a member of the Sejm since the 2019 election after being elected on the Law and Justice list. He has been a member and Vice President of the Agreement political party until 2021. He currently heads the OdNowa RP political party. He previously served as the town councilor in Opole between 2010 and 2018, and from 2018 to 2019 he served as the member of the Opole sejmik. Since 2019, he has been the Vice-Minister of National Defense.

References 

Living people
1984 births
People from Opole
Members of the Polish Sejm 2019–2023